Eurobasket.com also commonly referred to as "Eurobasket News", is a basketball-centered website that provide coverages of every professional and semi-professional leagues around the world. Although primarily focusing on European basketball, the website hosts several different regional sections for North America, Latin America, Africa, Asia, and Oceania. Eurobasket.com covers basketball in 193 countries and 435 leagues around the world, with over 382,000 player profiles updated daily.

History
Eurobasket is the most known website about international basketball coverage. Originally it was established in 1995 as Euroster.com in Canada by Marek Wojtera (Polish immigrant, former basketball player and a computer programmer) and 2 years later it changed its name to Eurobasket.com. In 2010, it was incorporated into Hong Kong based web programming company Sports I.T. Solutions.

Overview
The news content is provided by its full-time staff and over 100 correspondents located around the world. Eurobasket is known as the source of most complete basketball coverage and data collection about basketball.
The site also hosts a database of over 900,000 coaches and players both active or retired around the world, with some of that content being accessible only through subscription.

Summer league
Eurobasket.com also operates the Eurobasket Summer League, which are annual three day tournaments in the United States that visit in five host cities (Las Vegas, Chicago, Dallas, Atlanta, New York/New Jersey) in addition to the NCAA Women's Final Four. Their aim is to help unsigned free agents find professional clubs overseas and to that end, 767 former Eurobasket Summer League players were active on professional rosters in 67 different countries in 2019/20 season. The events, cater to both men and women, have hosted players from lesser known backgrounds (NCAA Division III colleges for example) to enable them to gain more exposure with games broadcast live on YouTube which has received over 125,000 views since 2018.

Related websites 
Eurobasket.com's affiliated sections:

 Africa – Afrobasket.com
 Asia – Asia-basket.com
 Europe – Eurobasket.com
 Latin America – Latinbasket.com
 Northern America – USbasket.com
 Oceania – Australiabasket.com
 Basketball agents – HoopsAgents.com
 ESL – EurobasketSummerLeague.com

References

External links

Basketball websites
Internet properties established in 1997